The 2016 Campeón de Campeones was a Mexican football match played on 10 July 2016 between the champions of the 2015–16 Liga MX season Apertura and Clausura champions, UANL (Apertura 2015 champions) and Pachuca (Clausura 2016 champions). Like the 2015 edition, the 2016 Campeón de Campeones consisted of one match at a neutral venue in the United States. The match took place at the StubHub Center in Carson, California.

The 2016 Campeón de Campeones was part of a doubleheader, which also included the 2016 Supercopa MX, organized by Univision Deportes, Soccer United Marketing (SUM), and Liga MX.

Match details

References

2016
2016–17 in Mexican football
July 2016 sports events in Mexico